The Aéro-Club de France was founded as the Aéro-Club on 20 October 1898 as a society 'to encourage aerial locomotion' by Ernest Archdeacon, Léon Serpollet, Henri de la Valette, Jules Verne and his wife, André Michelin, Albert de Dion, Alberto Santos-Dumont, Henri Deutsch de la Meurthe, and Henry de La Vaulx. On 20 April 1909, its name was changed to Aéro-Club de France.

The Aéro-Club de France originally set many of the regulations that controlled aviation in France. From its formation it also set the rules that have marked some of the 'firsts' in aviation, such as the first closed-circuit flight of over 1 km and the first helicopter flight, and has organised competitions including:
 the Prix Deutsch de la Meurthe, a challenge for dirigibles from 1901
 the Gordon Bennett Cup for fixed-wing aircraft in 1909

The club published the journal L'Aérophile from 1898 to 1947, and since 1997 publishes the magazine Aérofrance.

The Aéro-Club de France was a founding member of the International Aeronautical Federation (FAI) in 1905, a joint effort with other national associations.

After 1945, some of the Aéro-Club's regulatory roles were taken by other bodies. It now focusses on the promotion of aviation and certification.

Medal

The Club grants the Great Medal of the Aéro-Club de France to individuals who have made outstanding contributions to the advancement of aviation. The winners have been:

 2006 - The flight test team of the Airbus A380 and the Dassault Falcon 7X
 2005 - Pierre Guyoti
 2004 - At the retirement of Concorde, the heads of EADS, British Aerospace, Air France and British Airways
 2003 - Steve Fossett
 2002 - The astronauts of the Andromeda mission
 2000 - Jean-Pierre Haigneré, ESA astronaut
 1998 - Bertrand Piccard, of the Breitling Orbiter 3 balloon
 1997 - Claudie Haigneré, Shannon Lucid, Yelena Kondakova
 1996 - Jules Roy, author
 1995 - Serge Dassault
 1994 - Henri Pescarolo
 1988 - Jean Salis, Chuck Yeager
 1986 - Patrick Baudry
 1981 - John Young, Robert Crippen
 1970 - Jim Lovell, Jack Swigert, Fred Haise
 1969 - Neil Armstrong, Buzz Aldrin, Michael Collins
 1967 - Adrienne Bolland, Élisabeth Boselli, Marcel Dassault, Didier Daurat, Jean Lasserre, Georges Libert, Henry Potez
 1963 - Jacqueline Auriol
 1958 - Gabriel Voisin
 1938 - Henri Guillaumet, Paul Tissandier
 1937 - Maryse Bastié
 1931 - Maurice Noguès
 1930 - Jean Mermoz, Maurice Bellonte
 1928 - Joseph Le Brix
 1927 - Charles Lindbergh
 1923 - Louis Bréguet, Pierre-Georges Latécoère, Dieudonné Costes
 1922 - Clément Ader
 1920 - Joseph Sadi-Lecointe
 1917 - Warrant Officer Lucien Jailles, Sergeant Walter Lovell, Warrant Officer Raoul Lufbery, Archibald Johnson, Willis Haviland, Captain Georges Thenault, Warrant Officer Harold Willis, Second Lieutenant Henri Languedoc, Lieutenant J.A. Tourtay, Second Lieutenant Hector Varlin, Second Lieutenant William Thaw, Lieutenant Albert Dullin, Captains Alfred Heurtaux and Georges Guynemer, Second Lieutenant Paul Tarascon, and Captain André Wateau
 1912 - Roland Garros
 1911 - Jules Védrines
 1910 - Géo Chavez
 1909 - Louis Blériot
 1908 - Henri Farman, Wilbur Wright, Orville Wright
 1901 - Alberto Santos-Dumont, Henri Deutsch de la Meurthe, Robert Lebaudy
 1900 - Henry de La Vaulx

See also
 List of pilots awarded an Aviator's Certificate by the Aéro-Club de France in 1909
 List of pilots awarded an Aviator's Certificate by the Aéro-Club de France in 1911
 Fédération française de parachutisme

References

External links
 Aéro-Club de France website

 
Flying clubs
Clubs and societies in France
Organizations established in 1898
Air Cadet organisations
1898 establishments in France